Dunn's Famous Deli and Steakhouse is a chain of Jewish delis serving Montreal-style smoked meat, pastrami and cheesecake founded in Montreal, Quebec, Canada, by Myer Dunn.

History
Dunn, who immigrated to Canada in 1911, opened his first restaurant in 1927 on Avenue Papineau near Avenue du Mont-Royal. In 1948 he opened his first restaurant to be called "Dunn's Famous Delicatessen" at the corner of Avenue du Parc and Avenue du Mont-Royal.

In 1955 he opened his flagship restaurant at 892 Saint Catherine Street West. The storefront windows were famous for the top-to-bottom stacks of large jars full of hot banana peppers. The deli was open 24 hours a day, unusual for restaurant in the downtown core. Beginning in the 1970s Dunn's Famous began to focus more on Montreal-style smoked meat, eventually stopping its promotion of Pastrami.

The iconic Saint Catherine Street deli closed in 1998, but a new restaurant was opened in 2000 on Metcalfe Street, close to the old location, by Dunn's grandson.

Ina Devine, daughter of Aideh Dunn, has franchised the restaurant, now with multiple locations across Ontario, Elliot Kligman has franchises in Quebec and also offers Dunn's brand products to retail sellers.

Bill 101
The Parti Québécois provincial government amended Bill 101 in the 1980s, making French the official language of the Quebec government. In the mid-1980s, several Jewish delicatessens ran afoul of the law, including Dunn's and Schwartz's, the latter whose owner of which was subjected to failed legal action by the OLF due to the apostrophe in his sign, which remains.

In the mid-1980s, Dunn's got into trouble with Bill 101 for having the English term "smoked meat" on the sign out front. Dunn's manager at the time stated in defence of the sign that Parti Québécois MNA Gérald Godin himself ordered the sandwich by its name. Dunn's also fought a ruling to change the name of "smoked meat" to "boeuf mariné" in order to conform to the Quebec Charter of the French language.  They won the ruling on appeal by proving that if they did not advertise "smoked meat" by that term they would confuse and anger customers.  Due to the work of Aideh Dunn, under the new ruling, enacted in 1987, smoked meat became a word in both official languages of Canada.

Locations
There are currently ten locations, which are:

Quebec
 Greater Montreal: 
 Downtown Montreal
 Decarie Boulevard and Jean-Talon Street, across from the Namur Metro station
 Dollard-des-Ormeaux, in Marché de l'Ouest
 Laval
 Saint-Eustache
 Taschereau Boulevard, Greenfield Park

British Columbia
 Vancouver

Ontario

 Ottawa: 
 Byward Market
 Elgin Street
 Shefford Road
 Merivale Road
 Bank Street
 Rockland
 Hawkesbury
 South Mountain

See also

 List of Jewish delis 
 List of Canadian restaurant chains

References

External links

1927 establishments in Quebec
Companies based in Montreal
Jewish delicatessens in Canada
Jews and Judaism in Montreal
Montreal cuisine
Restaurant chains in Canada
Restaurants established in 1927
Restaurants in Montreal